This is a list of the equipment used by the Royal Cambodian Army.

In order to decrease its dependence on former Warsaw Pact military equipment (a legacy of the Kampuchea People's Revolutionary Armed Forces), Cambodia has begun to explore the possibility of purchasing Chinese and European vehicles and equipment.

On the 10 December 2021, the Prime Minister of Cambodia, Samdech Hun Sen, ordered the Cambodian Armed Forces to destroy or put into reserve all US-origin military equipment, in response to the American backed military embargo imposed on Cambodia.

Infantry equipment

Sidearms

Personal defence weapon

Infantry rifles

Precision rifles

Machine guns

Grenade launchers

Anti-armor weapons

Mortar fire weapons

Man-portable air defense systems

Towed artillery

Howitzer

Multiple rocket launchers

Anti-aircraft gun

Vehicles

Armoured vehicles

Main battle tanks

Light tanks

Infantry fighting vehicles

Armoured personnel carriers

Armoured reconnaissance vehicles

Armoured engineering vehicles

Transports

References 

Military of Cambodia
Cambodia
Equipment